A Black nor'easter is a persistent and potentially violent north-easterly storm that occurs on the east coast of Australia usually between late spring and early autumn, about two days a year (or more, depending on the intensity), although not a convection wind, but a storm system that develops offshore which can last several days. This is heralded by the rapid build-up of dense black cloud that can convert to a gale in well under one hour, and also bringing with it a heavy rainfall event usually accompanied by a thunderstorm. This type of storm was first recorded during the 1800s.

Background
Northeasterly sea breezes are a common occurrence on the NSW coast during summer, generated by temperature imbalances between the sea and the land. A broader synoptic pattern however can greatly intensify these onshore winds, which results in a "Black Nor'easter", so-named because of its dark grey to virtually black clouds and the moist gale-force winds (around 60 kilometres per hour) brought on by intense high-pressure systems, thus eventually bringing thunderstorms, dramatic rainfall and at times hail. Unlike an East coast low, which tends to occur in the cool months, a black nor'easter occurs in the warm months and originates from the northeast, therefore providing generally pleasant temperatures, although a black nor'easter can turn into an east coast low as it heads south, such as in the case of the 2022 Eastern Australia flood event.

Formation
On a hot sunny day in Sydney, the land heats up rapidly during the morning. The prevailing early morning wind is a light south-west offshore breeze (a katabatic wind) that blows from land to sea, but as the land heats up a north-east convection wind develops. A typical sea breeze, it starts shortly after sunrise on the coast and gradually pushes inland as the day proceeds, typically reaching the city by mid to late morning and the Greater Western Sydney area by early to mid afternoon. Though it doesn't dramatically decrease the temperatures as the southerly buster does, it would bring heavy rain, thunder and even hail at times for a few days.

Referred as an anticyclone intensification and usually intensified by a blocking high, the nor'easter causes a sharp leap in wave heights from the east-northeast for the east coast, conjuring a strong north-east air current and east-north east storm waves over the western Tasman Sea. The winds ofttimes produce large waves and, when combined with an east coast low, they bring forth the most intense storm wave environment. The north-east wind field leading warm moist tropical air to the subtropics and mid-latitudes can combine with a higher level cut off low from the Southern Ocean.

Incidents

Due to the strong winds caused by the Black Nor'easterly storms, a number of people in New South Wales (especially in Sydney) have been killed by falling trees. Furthermore, such storms also bring torrential floods, strike down power lines (where thousands of homes and businesses would be left without electricity) and collapse roofs.

Notable storms
 In February 2010, Sydney received some of the highest and heaviest rainfalls in 25 years which were accompanied by violent thunderstorms and gusty winds that cut out power and damaged homes. The heavy rain was caused by remnants of ex-tropical Cyclone Olga and by a massive amount of moisture blowing in on north-east winds which slammed into a low pressure trough.
 On 18 November 2013, a tornado hit Hornsby, a suburb in the Upper North Shore. The tornado blew off roofs and toppled large trees. The winds in the tornado reached . A total of 12 people were injured in the tornado.
 The 'Black Nor'Easter' swell of June 2016 remoulded areas of the east Australian coastline, with backyards tumbling down into the sea at Collaroy and the houses adjoining them damaged. Bridges, piers, and walkways were felled as well. Almost every north facing beach endured some level of erosion, from unsophisticated scouring of the foredune to waves devouring into the brown dirt. In Cronulla, several large boulders were thrown from beneath the tide zone up onto a rock platform.
 Between 7 and 9 February 2020, the Sydney metropolitan area received its heaviest rain in 30 years, in addition to vast flooding and strong winds that caused commuter chaos and left over 100,000 homes without power. The storm also affected the South Coast, Blue Mountains, Southern Highlands, Hunter Valley and the Central Coast.
 On 20 March 2021, a tornado damaged homes and toppled trees in Chester Hill, a western suburb of Sydney, leaving thousands without electricity. On the same day, in Taree, New South Wales, a house was found drifting in Manning River after heavy rainfall caused by this nor'easter, in addition to many evacuations throughout the eastern seaboard. The SES had responded to over 6,000 requests for help and 550 direct flood rescues since 18 March during the storm, with the coastal area between the Mid North Coast and the Illawarra being the most affected by the storm, which was described as a "prolonged event" by NSW premier Gladys Berejiklian and "dangerous and threatening" by the Bureau of Meteorology. Moreover, the storm brought record rainfall in the north coast, with towns near Port Macquarie, such as Kendall seeing record rainfall of more than 400 millimetres (16 inches) between 19 and 20 March. This heavy rainfall event was caused by a blocking high in the Tasman Sea that directed a strong, moist, low pressure trough towards the NSW coast.
 In late February and early March 2022, a black nor'easter persisted for nearly two weeks where it ravaged the southeast coast of Australia, flooding areas of major cities such as Brisbane, Lismore and as well as western Sydney, among other cities. Although the nor'easter turned into an east coast low as it moved south.

See also

Southerly Buster
Australian east coast low
Nor'easter
Severe storm events in Sydney

References

Extratropical cyclones
Weather events in Australia
Coastline of New South Wales
Coastline of Victoria (Australia)
Winds
Climate of Australia